Dušan Drašković (born 20 June 1939) is a Montenegrin former football manager and player. He is considered one of the pioneers of modern football in Ecuador.

Playing career
During his playing career, Drašković played for Spartak Subotica, Vojvodina, Radnički Niš and Vrbas. He represented Yugoslavia at the 1971 Mediterranean Games, winning the gold medal.

Managerial career
In his early managerial career, Drašković served as manager of Vrbas (twice), Vojvodina and Spartak Subotica, before leaving his homeland in 1988. Drašković managed Ecuador at the Copa América tournament in 1989, 1991 and 1993. At club level, Drašković was manager of a number of club sides in Brazil (Bragantino), Colombia (Atlético Junior), Ecuador (Barcelona SC, Macará and Emelec), and Guatemala (Comunicaciones).

Drašković has also managed FK Vojvodina and FK Borac Banja Luka in former SFR Yugoslavia.

Notes

References

External links
 

1939 births
Living people
Sportspeople from Banja Luka
Association football midfielders
Yugoslav footballers
FK Spartak Subotica players
FK Vojvodina players
FK Radnički Niš players
FK Vrbas players
Yugoslav First League players
Yugoslav football managers
Serbia and Montenegro football managers
FK Vrbas managers
FK Vojvodina managers
FK Spartak Subotica managers
Ecuador national football team managers
Clube Atlético Bragantino managers
Barcelona S.C. managers
Bolivia national football team managers
Sierra Leone national football team managers
Comunicaciones F.C. managers
Atlético Junior managers
C.S.D. Macará managers
C.S. Emelec managers
1989 Copa América managers
1991 Copa América managers
1993 Copa América managers
Yugoslav expatriate football managers
Serbia and Montenegro expatriate football managers
Expatriate football managers in Ecuador
Yugoslav expatriate sportspeople in Ecuador
Serbia and Montenegro expatriate sportspeople in Ecuador 
Expatriate football managers in Brazil
Serbia and Montenegro expatriate sportspeople in Brazil 
Expatriate football managers in Bolivia
Serbia and Montenegro expatriate sportspeople in Bolivia 
Expatriate football managers in Sierra Leone
Expatriate football managers in Guatemala
Serbia and Montenegro expatriate sportspeople in Guatemala 
Expatriate football managers in Colombia
Serbia and Montenegro expatriate sportspeople in Colombia
Mediterranean Games gold medalists for Yugoslavia
Mediterranean Games medalists in football
Competitors at the 1971 Mediterranean Games
Delfín S.C. managers